Linda Teresa Sánchez (born January 28, 1969) is an American politician and former labor lawyer serving as the U.S. representative for  since 2013. Sánchez serves on the Ways and Means Committee; she was the ranking member on the House Ethics Committee until 2017. In the 114th Congress, she chaired the Congressional Hispanic Caucus.

In 2016, Sánchez's colleagues elected her vice chair of the House Democratic Caucus for the 115th Congress, the fifth-ranking position in House Democratic leadership, thus becoming the first woman of color elected to a leadership position in the history of the U.S. Congress. She is the younger sister of former U.S. Representative Loretta Sanchez; to date, they are the only pair of sisters to have served in Congress.

Early life, education and career
Sánchez was born on January 28, 1969, in Orange, California. She grew up with six siblings, raised by Mexican immigrant parents in Anaheim, where she attended Valencia High School. She earned her BA in Spanish literature with an emphasis in bilingual education at the University of California, Berkeley, and her Juris Doctor degree in 1995 at the UCLA School of Law, where she was an editor of the Chicano-Latino Law Review.

Before her public service career, Sánchez was an attorney specializing in labor law. In 1998, she joined the International Brotherhood of Electrical Workers (IBEW) Local 441 and became a compliance officer. From 2000 to 2002, she was executive secretary and treasurer of the Orange County branch of the AFL-CIO.

Political campaigns

39th congressional district (2003–2013)
Sánchez started her political career in what was then the 39th district. That district had previously been the 38th, represented by five-term Republican Steve Horn. It already had a modest Democratic lean, but redistricting following the 2000 U.S. Census made it even more Democratic, prompting Horn to retire.

Sánchez finished first in a six-person primary for the Democratic nomination in March 2002. She won the primaries with 33.5% of the vote; the second-place candidate, Hector de la Torre, received 29.3%. She went on to win the general election against Republican Tim Escobar, 54.9% to 40.8%. This made Sánchez the first woman IBEW member to be elected to Congress.

She ran unopposed in the Democratic primaries in 2004. She faced Escobar again in the general election, defeating him 60.7% to 39.3%. In the 2006 election, she defeated two primary challengers with 77.8% of the vote and attorney James L. Andion in the general election.

Linda and her sister Loretta became the first pair of sisters to serve together in the U.S. House of Representatives. Loretta represented an Orange County district from 1997 until 2017, after she announced her candidacy for the U.S. Senate. She finished second in California's "top two" primary, before she was defeated by fellow Democrat, then state attorney general, now Vice President Kamala Harris, in the 2016 general election.

38th congressional district (2013–present)
After the 2010 U.S. Census, Sánchez's district was renumbered the 38th district. In the upcoming election she faced Republican Ryan Downing.

U.S. House of Representatives

Committee assignments
 Committee on Ways and Means
 Subcommittee on Select Revenue Measures
 Subcommittee on Social Security
 Subcommittee on Trade

Party leadership and caucus memberships
 House Democratic Party Steering and Policy Committee
 Co-founder of the Labor and Working Families Caucus
 International Conservation Caucus
 Congressional Arts Caucus
 Congressional Asian Pacific American Caucus
Congressional Hispanic Caucus
United States Congressional International Conservation Caucus
Congressional Progressive Caucus

Sánchez has two committee assignments in the House: the Committee on Ethics and the United States House Committee on Ways and Means. In 2005, she was appointed Assistant Minority Whip. She is a member of the Congressional Hispanic Caucus and co-chairs the Congressional Labor and Working Families Caucus, which she co-founded. She is also a vice chair of the Congressional LGBT Equality Caucus.

Political positions

Abortion 
Sánchez is pro-choice and has voted against repealing federal funding for abortions. She opposed legislation to bar transporting minors between states for abortions and making it a crime to harm a fetus in another crime. According to research by Project Vote Smart:

 Sánchez "supported the interests of the National Right to Life Committee 0 percent in 2010."
 On October 13, 2011, Sánchez "strongly opposed" the Protect Life Act (H.R. 358).
 Sánchez supported the interests of NARAL Pro-Choice America.
 Sánchez has voted against many anti-abortion bills, such as the Abortion Pain Bill, prohibiting federally funded abortion services, prohibiting taxpayer funding of abortion, and the Child Interstate Abortion Notification Act.

She opposed the overturning of Roe v. Wade.

Budget and economy 
Sánchez voted against spending prioritizing in the event the debt limit is reached. In 2009, she supported a $192 billion anti-recession stimulus package, an $825 billion bailout fund, a $15 billion bailout for GM and Chrysler, and a $60 billion stimulus package. She voted in 2011 to raise the debt limit to $16.7 trillion. She opposes any move to privatize Social Security. As of 2014, she supported reducing defense spending to balance the budget.

Civil rights 
Sánchez received a 100% rating from the NAACP, indicating a pro–affirmative action position. She supports gay rights and opposes discrimination based on sexual orientation or gender. On October 4, 2011, Sánchez made a statement on LGBT History Month, saying: "We must continue to strive to end discrimination in the workplace based on sexual orientation and fight so that all Americans have the right to marry and start families with those they love. I remain committed to supporting marriage equality, investments in HIV/AIDS care, treatment and research, and campaigns that take action against bullying in schools."

In a February 9, 2010, letter to President Barack Obama, then-Speaker of the House Nancy Pelosi, and Senator Charles Schumer, Sánchez wrote: "Currently, U.S. citizens and legal permanent residents may sponsor their spouses (and other immediate family members) for immigration purposes. But same-sex partners committed to spending their lives together are not recognized as 'families' under U.S. immigration law and thus do not have this same right. [...] This is unacceptable, and we believe comprehensive immigration reform legislation must include a strong family reunification component inclusive of LGBT families."

Drug policy 
Sánchez supports drug reform and allowing people with drug-related convictions to receive student loans if they are deemed to be rehabilitated. She also seeks to expunge records of first-time drug offenders after probation.

Energy & oil 
Sánchez opposes new exploration for oil drilling and would remove tax benefits for oil and gas exploration. She has also opposed permits and construction for new oil refineries. She supports tax credits and incentives for investments in renewable energy.

Environment 
Sánchez opposes legislation that would bar the Environmental Protection Agency from regulating emissions. She supports higher emission standards and tradable allowances. She supports the cash-for-clunkers program and seeks to increase public transportation and trains through federally funded projects.

Sánchez supports the addition of several species to the IUCN Red List and promotes more extensive nature conservation.

Government reform 
Sánchez supports lobbyist disclosures for campaign finances as well as requiring full disclosure of campaign finances. She seeks to guarantee free and fair elections.

After Hurricane Katrina in August 2005, President George W. Bush suspended the Davis-Bacon Act, a 1931 law that requires government contractors to pay prevailing wages. Sánchez was a very vocal critic of the suspension, and led the fight to reverse it. Bush reversed the suspension on October 26, 2005.

Gun control 
Sánchez supports gun control and believes in background checks, no fly-no buy, and gun violence research. She seeks to close the gun show loophole for firearm sales. She believes gun manufacturers and sellers are accountable and ought to be liable for misuse cases by users.

Health care 
Sánchez opposes the privatization of Medicare in any form, and opposes spending cuts to Medicare. She supports expanding healthcare coverage by a number of programs through federal funding. She has said that she believes health care is a basic right. She declined to vote for Representative John Conyers's universal health care bill HR 676, citing the need to support the Affordable Care Act.

Immigration
After the Arizona state legislature passed State Senate Bill 1070 and Arizona Governor Jan Brewer signed it into law, Sánchez claimed that the law, and similar laws throughout the country, were the product of white supremacists: "There's a concerted effort behind promoting these kinds of laws on a state-by-state basis by people who have ties to white supremacy groups. It's been documented. It's not mainstream politics." Representative Gary Miller called Sánchez's comments "an outrageous accusation." Steve Poizner also condemned them.

Technology
Twice in 2009, Sánchez introduced the "Megan Meier Cyberbullying Prevention Act," H.R. 1966, a bill that would criminalize the use of electronic communications if "the intent is to coerce, intimidate, harass, or cause substantial emotional distress to a person." The bill is a response to the suicide of Megan Meier, a 13-year-old girl whose 2006 suicide was attributed to cyberbullying on the social networking site MySpace. The bill has drawn criticism from members of the online community, legal scholars, and others who contend that it would infringe on the constitutional right to freedom of speech.

Tax reform 
Sánchez supports a progressive tax system and voted against maintaining reduced tax rates for capital gains and dividends. She was rated a "Big Spender" by NTU, indicating she generally supports higher tax rates.

War
In 2014, Sánchez opposed combat operations in during the War in Afghanistan.

In 2023, Sanchez was among 56 Democrats to vote in favor of H.Con.Res. 21, which directed President Joe Biden to remove U.S. troops from Syria within 180 days.

Personal life

Sánchez married Jim Sullivan on April 13, 2009, in the district office of Congressman John B. Larson, who introduced the two about two years before the wedding. The marriage is Sánchez's second, and Sullivan has three sons from a previous marriage. On May 13, 2009, she became the eighth woman to give birth while serving in Congress when she had her first son.

Sánchez's father, Ignacio, suffers from Alzheimer's disease, which Sánchez has cited as a motivation for finding a cure for the disease.

Sánchez is the younger sister of former Congresswoman Loretta Sanchez. They are the first and to date only sister pair to serve in Congress. Linda is considered somewhat more liberal than Loretta. Loretta began her political career as a moderate Republican before becoming a Democrat, but Linda has always been a Democrat. Loretta was a member of the Blue Dog Coalition and the New Democrat Coalition, and Linda is a member of the Congressional Progressive Caucus.

Sánchez delivered the Spanish version of the Democratic Radio Address on May 6, 2006.

Works
 Linda Sánchez, Loretta Sánchez and Richard Buskin, Dream in Color: How the Sánchez Sisters Are Making History in Congress, Grand Central Publishing (September 2, 2008) , foreword by Nancy Pelosi

In 2008, Loretta and Linda Sánchez published the joint memoir Dream in Color: How the Sánchez Sisters Are Making History in Congress. Publishers Weekly reviewed the book and wrote: "Linda and Loretta Sánchez present their compelling story—noteworthy not only for their history-making achievements (including first sisters or women of any relation to serve together in Congress, first woman and person of color to represent a district in Orange County, first Latina on the House Judiciary Committee and first Head Start child to be elected to Congress) but also for its 'American Dream' aspect—their parents immigrated from Mexico and despite lacking a formal education managed to send their seven children to college. Interweaving childhood vignettes with accounts of serving in Congress, both from California, this refreshing book evades many of the tropes of the typical political memoir—perhaps because these two women are not typical politicians."

See also
 List of Hispanic and Latino Americans in the United States Congress
 Women in the United States House of Representatives

References

External links

 Congresswoman Linda Sanchez official U.S. House website
 Linda Sanchez for Congress campaign website
 
 

|-

|-

|-

|-

1969 births
21st-century American politicians
21st-century American women politicians
American feminists
American labor lawyers
American lawyers of Mexican descent
American politicians of Mexican descent
American Roman Catholics
American women lawyers
Anti-cyberbullying activists
Female members of the United States House of Representatives
Hispanic and Latino American members of the United States Congress
Hispanic and Latino American women in politics
Trade unionists from California
American women trade unionists
Living people
Democratic Party members of the United States House of Representatives from California
People from Anaheim, California
People from Lakewood, California
People from Orange, California
University of California, Berkeley alumni
UCLA School of Law alumni
Women in California politics
Catholics from California
21st-century non-fiction writers